Downtown Laredo is the second main business district in Laredo, Texas. Downtown Laredo is the starting point for Interstate Highway 35 and State Highway 359. It is home to all of Laredo's high-rise buildings. Laredo's and Webb County's main government buildings are located in Downtown Laredo. Most of Webb County's National Register of Historic Places are in this area.

Location
Downtown Laredo is located in South Central Laredo, Texas at the terminus of Interstate Highway 35. On the opposite side of the Rio Grande, Downtown Nuevo Laredo is located. Downtown Laredo is roughly bounded by I-35 on the East, the Rio Grande on the South and West and Park Street in the North. This area was the original city of Laredo, founded in 1755 by Don Tomás Sanchez.

Points of interest
Points of interest in Downtown Laredo are:
Educational
Laredo Community College Fort McIntosh campus
Financial
Laredo National Bank headquarters
International Bank of Commerce headquarters
Historical according to the National Register of Historic Places
Barrio Azteca Historic District
Fort Mcintosh
Hamilton Hotel
Laredo Federal Building 
Republic of the Rio Grande Museum
San Agustin Cathedral
San Agustin Historical District
Webb County Courthouse
Retail
El Portal Center mall
Streets of Laredo Urban Mall
Transportation
Gateway to the Americas International Bridge
Juarez-Lincoln International Bridge
Other
Rio Grande

Gallery

References

Neighborhoods in Laredo, Texas
Laredo